The 2015 Campeonato Brasileiro Série D, the fourth level of the Brazilian League, was contested by 40 clubs, and started on July 12 and ended on November 15, 2015. The four teams in the semifinals were promoted to the 2016 Campeonato Brasileiro Série C.

Competition format
The 40 teams are divided in eight groups of 5, playing within them in a double round-robin format. The two best ranked in each group at the end of 8 rounds will qualify to the Second Stage, which will be played in home-and-away system. Winners advance to Third Stage. The quarterfinal winners will be promoted to the 2016 Série C. As there is no Série E, or fifth division, technically there will be no relegation. However, teams who were not promoted will have to re-qualify for 2016 Série D through their respective state leagues.

Participating teams

First stage

Group A1

Group A2

Group A3

Group A4

Group A5

Group A6

Group A7

Group A8

Round of 16

Quarterfinals

Semifinals

Finals

References

4
Campeonato Brasileiro Série D seasons